Migingo is a  island in Kenya on Lake Victoria. The island was the center of a low-level territorial dispute between Kenya and Uganda and is extremely densely populated. Migingo island is found in Kenya and is a main source of fish to the Kenyan people.

History
Two Kenyan fishermen, Dalmas Tembo and George Kibebe, claim to have been the first inhabitants on the island. When they settled there in 1991, it was covered with weeds and many birds and snakes lived there. Joseph Nsubuga, a Ugandan fisherman, says he settled on Migingo in 2004, when all he found on the island was an abandoned house. Subsequently, other fishermen — from Kenya, Uganda and Tanzania — came to the island because of its proximity to fishing grounds rich with Nile perch.

Uganda–Kenya dispute
In June 2004, according to the Kenyan government, Ugandan marine police pitched a tent on the island and raised the Ugandan flag and that of their police department. Ugandan and Kenyan police have since occupied the island at various times.

A diplomatic row between the two countries arose in February 2009, when Kenyans living on Migingo were required to purchase special permits from the Ugandan government.

On 12 March 2009, a Ugandan-government press release proposed that the matter be resolved by a survey, using as a guideline the boundaries set by the Kenya Colony and Protectorate Order in Council, 1926, which is copied into the Ugandan constitution, and which identifies the boundary line as tangentially touching the western tip of Pyramid Island, and then running in a straight line just west of due north to the western tip of Kenya's' Ilemba Island.

On 13 March 2009, several government ministers, including the foreign-affairs ministers — Kenyan Moses Wetangula and Ugandan Sam Kutesa — met in Kampala, Uganda, and reached an agreement that the fishermen from both countries be allowed to continue conducting business as usual, until the boundary was determined by experts. They also agreed that Uganda would withdraw the 48 policemen it had deployed on Migingo.

On 27 March 2009, Ugandan and Kenyan ministers travelled to the island where they held negotiations and addressed the residents. This ended in a row, with Ugandan First Deputy Prime Minister Eriya Kategaya taking issue with Kenyan Minister for Lands James Orengo for calling the Ugandan delegation "hyenas" during the meeting. The Kenyan delegation demanded that Uganda withdraw its police. The Ugandan delegation insisted that they would remove the flag only after consulting their president and that the Ugandan policemen were there to keep law and order. Kenya's Internal Security Assistant Minister Orwa Ojode replied that he would be sending Kenyan police to the island.

Amidst concerns that the dispute could affect cooperation between the two countries and within the East African Community, both Museveni and Kenyan President Mwai Kibaki had voiced confidence that the dispute, including fishing rights, will be resolved amicably.

Territorial claims
In 2008–2009, the island itself was claimed by both Kenya and Uganda. Since 1926, territorial ownership of the island has been consistently shown on maps and in language on official documents as Kenyan.

Much, if not most, of the Ugandan protests revolve around the lucrative fishing rights, mostly for valuable Nile perch, and Ugandan waters come within  of the island. In July 2009, the Ugandan government shifted its official position, stating that while Migingo Island was Kenyan, much of the waters near it were Ugandan. The island had been claimed by the Ugandan government in 2008-2009 until 11 May 2009 when Ugandan President Yoweri Museveni conceded that the island is in Kenya, but continued to point out that Kenyan fishermen were illegally fishing in Ugandan waters, which lie to the west of Migingo. The Ugandan flag was lowered, Uganda withdrew its military troops, and agreed that all its police officers would leave the island. A joint re-demarcation line of the border was launched on 2 June 2009 to recover and to place survey markers on land, making delineation of the boundary on the lake more precise, with results released in late July 2009 confirming that the island falls  on the Kenyan side of the line.

Geography
A rocky and rugged piece of land with little vegetation, Migingo is one of three small islands in close proximity. On detailed maps, all three islands have been shown on the Kenyan side since the 1920s, when the Kenya Colony and Protectorate Order in Council, 1926 awarded all three islands to Kenya. The boundary delineation in that 1926 agreement and the Constitution of Uganda state that the boundary line runs to "the westernmost point of Pyramid Island ... thence continuing by a straight line northerly to the most westerly point of Ilemba Island." Tiny Migingo's location within  of the much larger Usingo Island is clear both on Google Earth and on widely available television network videos depicting aerial helicopter photography.
Migingo Island is so small that it is not displayed on some maps. However, it has not "emerged from the water" recently, despite a Uganda government official's claims. In the first decade of the 21st century, water levels have dropped only  in the lake from the normal level.

Demographics
The island has a population of about 131 (according to the 2009 census), mostly fishermen and fish traders, who are served by four pubs, a number of brothels, and a pharmacy on the island. It has a density of more than 65,500 people per square kilometer which makes it one of the most densely populated islands in Africa and the world.

See also
Politics of Kenya
Politics of Uganda
Lake Victoria

References

External links
AFP news report from the island from July 2009 (hosted on YouTube.com)

Disputed islands
Lake islands of Kenya
Islands of Lake Victoria
Territorial disputes of Kenya
Territorial disputes of Uganda
Kenya–Uganda border